Amelanchier bartramiana is a species of serviceberry. Common names include mountain serviceberry, mountain shadbush, Bartram's serviceberry, mountain juneberry, Bartram juneberry, and the oblongfruit serviceberry.

The leaves of A. bartramiana are either brown or green coloured, are egg-shaped and tapered at both ends with fine teeth almost to the base. It has 6–12 teeth while its lateral veins comes 10–16 pairs. The flowers have five white petals, appearing singly or in clusters of up to four blossoms. The pomes are red, ripening to dark purple and are pear-shaped. The fruits are edible and can be eaten raw or cooked.

See also
Cranberry Glades, West Virginia

References

External links
 
 
 

bartramiana
Flora of Eastern Canada
Flora of the Northeastern United States
Flora of Wisconsin
Flora of Minnesota